Ethel Mars may refer to:

 Ethel Mars (artist) (1884–1959), American woodblock printmaker
 Ethel V. Mars (1884–1945), American businesswoman and racehorse owner